Rise Up (E), originally the National Renewal Party (PNR) until July 2020, is a Portuguese far-right nationalist political party.

History 
The PNR was established in February 2000. In July 2020, the party was renamed.

Controversy 

Although in the past the party did not reject connections to so-called neo-Nazi racist movements, it claims to be a target of political persecution. In their youth, some of its former members were convicted for racial discrimination and violent crimes, such as the racially motivated murder of Alcindo Monteiro in Lisbon, after being linked to far-right armed groups such as the Portuguese Hammerskins. In recent years, however, the party has expelled its members that have connections to these kinds of groups and, as a result, the former Portuguese Hammerskins leader Mário Machado has decided to try to create a new party, the New Social Order.

Election results 
In the 2005 legislative elections, the then PNR obtained just under 0.2% of the vote, failing to elect any deputies to Parliament by a wide margin. In the 2009 European election, the party had about 13,000 votes, having 0.37% of the vote, the party had its higher results in the districts of Lisbon and Setúbal. 2015 was the year the party most increased in votes, having received 27,269 votes in the legislative elections. An increase of just over 50% in comparison to 2011.

Since 2019 the right-wing populist CHEGA seems to be taking votes away from PNR.

Assembly of the Republic

European Parliament

Notes and references

Bibliography 
 

2000 establishments in Portugal
Anti-immigration politics in Europe
Anti-Islam political parties in Europe
Conservative parties in Portugal
Eurosceptic parties in Portugal
Far-right parties in Portugal
National conservative parties
Nationalist parties in Europe
Political parties established in 2000
Political parties in Portugal
Portuguese nationalism
Protectionism
Right-wing populist parties
Social conservative parties